Denisovskaya is a rural locality (a village) in Razinskoye Rural Settlement, Kharovsky District, Vologda Oblast, Russia. The population was 21 as of 2002.

Geography 
Denisovskaya is located 37 km north of Kharovsk (the district's administrative centre) by road. Kuryanovskaya is the nearest rural locality.

References 

Rural localities in Kharovsky District